"Holy God, We Praise Thy Name" (original German: "Großer Gott, wir loben dich") is a Christian hymn, a paraphrase of the Te Deum.

The German Catholic priest Ignaz Franz wrote the original German lyrics in 1771 as a paraphrase of the Te Deum, a Christian hymn in Latin from the 4th century. It became an inherent part of major Christian ceremonial occasions, mainly as a conclusion song. Due to its memorable melody and theme, it is one of the most popular hymns and prevalent in German-speaking communities.

As a result of German emigration in the 19th century, the song became known in the United States. It was translated into English by Clarence A. Walworth in 1858 (except verse 7, translated by Hugh T. Henry), which accounted for its wide spread around the country.

History 

The first printing of the hymn was in Vienna in 1776, where it became part of the Catholic hymnal (Katholisches Gesangsbuch) upon the order of Her Apostolic Majesty Maria Theresa. Since then, different variations of the German lyrics sprung up, of which two are still in use: one in Johann Gottfried Schicht's Allgemeines Choralbuch (1819) and that Heinrich Bone's Cantate (Mainz 1852)

Its original version from 1771, which was later amended by Ignaz Franz, consisted of 12 verses; however, the edit proved unpopular and the first version persisted, albeit with verses 5 and 6 combined. The melody first appeared in the Allgemeines Katholisches Gesangbuch (Vienna, c. 1774). A typical setting of the hymn is as follows:

On the initiative of Johann Gottfried Schicht, the hymn also entered Protestant hymnals, but was widely neglected for a long time due to its perceived status as a "spiritual folksong" in the Age of Enlightenment. Only in the 20th century was it fully accepted by Protestants, though shorter and altered versions are often sung (occasionally, two verses were completely replaced by the New Apostolic Church).

The hymn became also part of military hymnbooks where it was considered as a song of thanksgiving. The military hymnal of the Evangelical Church of 1939 added a final verse which praised the Führer, Adolf Hitler. The hymnal of the so-called "German Christians" (1941) was named after the song and contained a version which was "purified of Jewish elements" and altered to fit Nazi ideology.

The content of the song can be divided into three parts: a hymnic part praising God the Father (verses 1–4 in the English version, 1–5 in the German), a similar one about God the Son (verses 5–7 in English, 6–8 in German), and a series of petitions (verse 8 in English, 9–11 in German).

In the region of Upper Silesia in Poland, this hymn is loosely translated as "Ciebie, Boże wielbimy", replacing "Ciebie Boga wysławiamy" by Franciszek Wesołowski, which is the officially sanctioned Polish version of the Te Deum (also called the "Millenial Te Deum") by the Polish Episcopal Conference, and widespread in other regions of the country. It is usually performed in 4/4 metre instead of the traditional 3/4 tempus perfectum.

Text

References

External links 

 All verses; short facts about the history, cyberhymnal.org
 (German) Detailed description about the history of the song and different versions, lyrik-und-lied.de
 (German) Information from Liederdatenbank

Catholic hymns in German
18th-century hymns in German